My Mother Frank is a 2000 Australian film.

Plot
David Kennedy (Matthew Newton) is preparing to go to university. His mother, Frank (Sinéad Cusack) is a widow and has very little social life. David tells her that she should get out more and much to his surprise, Frank enrolls at the same university. Frank falls for her poetry tutor (Sam Neill), who hates mature students. David falls for his best friend's girlfriend (Rose Byrne), who isn't interested in the least.

Awards

 Nominated for Best Original Screenplay by the Australian Film Institute (Mark Lamprell)
 Nominated for Best Performance by an Actor in a Supporting Role by the Australian Film Institute (Sam Neill)
 Won ASSG Soundtrack of the Year from the Australian Screen Sound Guild (multiple nominees)
 Won Best Achievement in Sound for Dialogue & ADR Editing for a Feature Film from the Australian Screen Sound Guild (multiple nominees)
 Won Best Achievement in Sound for Foley for a Feature Film from the Australian Screen Sound Guild (multiple nominees)
 Won Most Popular Feature Film at the Melbourne International Film Festival (Mark Lamprell)
 Won Viewers'  Choice Award for Best Foreign Film at the Temecula Valley International Film Festival (Mark Lamprell)

References

External links 
 
 
My Mother Frank at Oz Movies

2000 films
2000 romantic comedy-drama films
Australian independent films
Australian romantic comedy-drama films
2000 independent films
2000 comedy films
2000 drama films
Films directed by Mark Lamprell
Films scored by Peter Best (composer)
2000s English-language films
2000s Australian films